The Gifu Swoops is a professional basketball team that competes in the third division of the Japanese B.League.

Coaches
Kenji Kajimoto
Kazuo Kusumoto

Roster

Notable players
Mike Allison
Adam Drexler
Bingo Merriex
Joe Wolfinger

Arenas
OKB Gifu Seiryu Arena
Gifu Memorial Center
Gujo City General Sports Center
Sekishin Fureai Arena
Gero Exchange Hall On Arena

References

External links

 
Basketball teams in Japan
Sports teams in Gifu Prefecture
Basketball teams established in 2003
2003 establishments in Japan